Orthogonius assamicola is a species of ground beetle in the subfamily Orthogoniinae. It was described by Tian & Deuve in 2006.

References

assamicola
Beetles described in 2006